It's Only the End of the World is a 1990 French play by Jean-Luc Lagarce. It is about a character named Louis who returns to his family to announce his terminal illness. Lagarce wrote the play in 1990, when he was considering his own death. In 2008, the Comédie-Française added the play to its repertoire. It won the 2008 Molière Award for Best Show in a National Theatre. In 2016, it was adapted into a film of the same name by Xavier Dolan.

Analysis
Louis returns home surprisingly, and suddenly leaves, after family members give monologues of varying lengths, sometimes repeating themselves or violating proper grammar. The characters' struggle to communicate, sometimes attempting to restate what they meant, is a theme in the play, illustrated by a scene where Suzanne criticizes two family members for shaking hands like strangers. Contradictory stage directions state the play is set on "a Sunday", but also covers almost one year.

Film adaptation

Canadian director Xavier Dolan said that when he originally read the play, he felt lost, citing its style and the aggressive nature of the characters. He later re-read it, saying "One day, I don't know what it was, I pulled it off my shelf and suddenly understood and appreciated this weird and verbose writing style."

Dolan described the extensive work required to adapt the stage play for film: 

Dolan's film won the Grand Prix at the 2016 Cannes Film Festival and other honours.

References

1990 plays
French plays adapted into films
LGBT-related plays